The Central Congregational Church is a historic church on Central Square in Galesburg, Illinois. The church was built from 1897 to 1898 to serve Galesburg's newly united Congregational church. Galesburg's two congregational churches formed in the 1850s after separating from the town's Presbyterian church; the two churches united in 1895 after one church began to collapse during a service. The brown sandstone used to construct the church was imported from Marquette, Michigan. The church's bell was formed from the bells used in the two Congregational churches before their union. In 1912, the church acquired an organ built by the M. P. Moller Company.

The church was added to the National Register of Historic Places on September 30, 1976.

References

Churches on the National Register of Historic Places in Illinois
Romanesque Revival church buildings in Illinois
Churches completed in 1898
Churches in Knox County, Illinois
Congregational churches in Illinois
National Register of Historic Places in Knox County, Illinois
1898 establishments in Illinois
1890s establishments in Illinois
Galesburg, Illinois